Ein Harod (Ihud) is a kibbutz in northern Israel. Located in the Jezreel Valley near Mount Gilboa, it falls under the jurisdiction of Gilboa Regional Council.

Etymology
The kibbutz is named after the nearby biblical spring of Ein Harod, known in English as the Well of Harod. The kibbutz is close to the site of the crucial battle of Ain Jalut from the year 1260, the first major Mongol defeat in the Middle Ages (Ein Jalut being the Arabic name of the spring).

History
It was formed in 1952 as a result of an ideological split in kibbutz Ein Harod (founded 1921), with  Mapam-supporting members forming Ein Harod (Meuhad) and Mapai-supporting members breaking away to create Ein Harod (Ihud), which joined the Mapai-affiliated Ihud HaKvutzot veHaKibbutzim. Today both kibbutzim belong to the same movement, the United Kibbutz Movement.

It is located on the land of the depopulated  Palestinian village of  Qumya.

Environmentalism
Ein Harod Ihud was Israel's first "green" kibbutz. The kibbutz has introduced a whole series of environmental projects. Recycling bins have been installed for sorting waste and an ecological garden is being planted based on a model developed by the Ministry of Environmental Protection and the Technion. The kibbutz is switching to  environmentally friendly detergents and has distributed a list of products not tested on animals. An energy survey has been conducted to identify alternative energy sources in the  kitchen, laundry and ironing room. Energy consumption is being cut by using energy-saving bulbs and air conditioners, and installing electricity meters in homes and public buildings. The Ministry of Agriculture has approved funding for research on energy efficiency in milk cooling.

References

Kibbutzim
Kibbutz Movement
Populated places established in 1952
Populated places in Northern District (Israel)
1952 establishments in Israel